Clavanin B is an alpha-helical antimicrobial peptide isolated from Styela clava.

References

Antimicrobial peptides